Muellerella thalamita is a species of lichenicolous fungus in the family Verrucariaceae. It grows on the apothecia of Orcularia insperata, Baculifera micromera and Hafellia disciformis, which are lichens that grow on bark.

References

Verrucariales
Fungi described in 1877
Lichenicolous fungi
Taxa named by James Mascall Morrison Crombie